Ka with circumflex (К̂ к̂) is a letter of the Cyrillic script. It was formerly used in the alphabet project of M. I. Raikov of the Khakas language.